is a professional Japanese baseball player. He plays pitcher for the Hiroshima Toyo Carp.

External links

NPB.com

1993 births
Living people
Baseball people from Hyōgo Prefecture
Japanese baseball players
Nippon Professional Baseball pitchers
Hiroshima Toyo Carp players